Ski racing may refer to:
    
Winter Olympic sports
 Alpine skiing
 Part of the biathlon
 Military patrol, the biathlon's predecessor sport
 Cross-country skiing (sport)
 Some of the freestyle skiing events, such as:
 Mogul skiing, where speed counts for a percentage of the score
 Ski cross
 Part of the Nordic combined

Other sports
 Randonnée racing
 Speed skiing
 Water ski racing
 Grass skiing
 Skijoring